Materials testing is used to assess product quality, functionality, safety, reliability and toxicity of both materials and electronic devices. Some applications of materials testing include defect detection, failure analysis, material development, basic materials science research, and the verification of material properties for application trials. This is a list of organizations and companies that publish materials testing standards or offer materials testing laboratory services.

International organizations for materials testing
These organizations create materials testing standards or conduct active research in the fields of materials analysis and reliability testing. 
 American Association of Textile Chemists and Colorists (AATCC)
 American National Standards Institute (ANSI)
 American Society of Heating, Refrigerating and Air-Conditioning Engineers (ASHRAE)
 American Society of Mechanical Engineers (ASME)
 ASTM International
 Federal Institute for Materials Research and Testing (German: Bundesanstalt für Materialforschung und -prüfung (BAM))
 Electrostatic Discharge Association (ESDA)
 European Reference Materials
 Instron
 International Committee for Non Destructive Testing (ICNDT)
 International Organization for Standardization (ISO)
 ISTFA
 MTS Systems Corporation 
 Nadcap
 National Physical Laboratory (United Kingdom)
 Society of Automotive Engineers (SAE)
 XYZTEC
 Zwick Roell Group

Global research laboratories for materials testing
These organizations provide materials testing laboratory services. 
 Evans Analytical Group (EAG)
 FADI-AMT; Advanced Material Testing
 FEI Company
 ISTI
 Lucideon
 Metallurgical Services in Mumbai, India
 Micom Laboratories
 Razi Metallurgical Research Center (RMRC)
 Rocky Mountain Laboratories 
 SEMATECH

See also
 Characterization (materials science)
 List of materials analysis methods

References

Tests
Materials testing
Engineering-related lists